Mahad Mohamed Salad ) is a Somali politician. He is the Director General of the National Intelligence and Security Agency, he served as the Deputy Minister of Foreign Affairs of Somalia in 2014. In February of the year, Salad was appointed state Minister of presidential affairs by Prime Minister Omar Abdirashid Ali Sharmarke.

References

Living people
Government ministers of Somalia
1973 births